Mount Atzmon is a mountain in the Northern District of Israel.

At the foot of the mountain is the Arab town of Kafr Manda, as well as the archaeological site of Jotapata (modern-day Yodfat), where Jewish forces led by Josephus made their last stand against the Romans.

See also 

 The nearby Beit Netofa Valley

References 

Lower Galilee
Mountains of Israel
First Jewish–Roman War